is a Japanese film director.

Filmography
Avec mon mari (1999)
Travail (2002)
Nana (2005)
Rough (2006)
Nana 2 (2006)
Runway Beat (2011)
Black Butler (2014)

References

External links

Japanese film directors
Living people
1965 births
People from Kyoto Prefecture